Hendrix Jim Balasoto Martin (born October 12, 1997), better known as Jimboy Martin, is a Filipino television personality known for winning the teen edition of the reality show Pinoy Big Brother: 737.

He is part of the all-male dance group of It's Showtime, called "Hashtags".

Filmography

Television

References

Living people
Pinoy Big Brother contestants
Filipino male television actors
1997 births
People from Nueva Vizcaya
Big Brother (franchise) winners
Star Magic